Stygobromus russelli, known generally as the Russell stygobromid or Russell's cave amphipod, is a species of amphipod in the family Crangonyctidae. It is endemic to Texas in the United States.

References

Further reading

 
 

russelli
Articles created by Qbugbot
Crustaceans described in 1967
Cave crustaceans
Endemic fauna of Texas
Taxobox binomials not recognized by IUCN